Wang Xiaolong (born 18 February 1989) is a Chinese former footballer.

Club career
Wang Xiaolong would play for the Dalian Shide youth team before being promoted to their reserve team Dalian Shide Siwu who were allowed to play as satellite team in the 2008 Singapore League. He would make his debut on 2 August 2008 in a league game against Albirex Niigata (S) in a 2-2 draw. He would not be promoted to the Dalian senior team and joined third tier football club Chongqing. This would be followed by joining Guizhou Hengfeng where he was part of the team that won the 2012 China League Two division. Guizhou allowed him to join Lijiang Jiayunhao before he went on to join second tier club Hebei China Fortune, however he did not make any appearances for them and joined fourth tier club Shaanxi Chang'an Athletic. Shaanxi Chang'an Athletic finished the runners-up in the national finals after losing Dalian Boyang in the penalty shoot-out but won promotion to 2017 China League Two. The team gained a third place position in the 2018 China League Two campaign, though losing to Meizhou Meixian Techand F.C. in the relegation play-offs, the team was promoted to the China League One due to the financial problem of the Yanbian Funde F.C.

Career statistics
Statistics accurate as of match played 31 December 2020.

Honours

Club
Guizhou Hengfeng
China League Two: 2012

References

External links

1989 births
Living people
Chinese footballers
Chinese expatriate footballers
Association football midfielders
Singapore Premier League players
China League Two players
China League One players
Guizhou F.C. players
Yunnan Flying Tigers F.C. players
Hebei F.C. players
Shaanxi Chang'an Athletic F.C. players
Chinese expatriate sportspeople in Singapore
Expatriate footballers in Singapore